Johannes Paulus Moreelse, or Johan Pauwelszon Moreelse ( – October 1634), was a Dutch baroque painter belonging to the school of Utrecht Caravaggism during the Dutch Golden Age.

Life

Moreelse was born in Utrecht, Holland.  His father, Paulus Moreelse, was at that time a famous portrait painter. Little is known about his life. Johan Moreelse studied in Utrecht, in the studio of his father, and then in Rome (1627), where he was appointed into a papal knight order. Moreelse died in his home town during a plague epidemic. His small number of known works were only assigned to him in the 1970s.

Gallery

References

Bibliography
B. Nicolson, Caravaggism in Europe, Oxford (1979), 2nd ed., dl. I, pp. 150–151
J. A. Spicer [e.a.], cat. tent. Masters of Light. Dutch painters in Utrecht during the Golden Age, Baltimore (The Walkers Art Gallery), San Francisco (Fine Arts Museum), London (The National Gallery) (1997–1998), pp. 385–386

External links

1603 births
1634 deaths
Dutch Golden Age painters
Dutch male painters
Artists from Utrecht
Caravaggisti